In criminology, the focal concerns theory, posited in 1962 by Walter B. Miller, attempts to explain the behavior of "members of adolescent street corner groups in lower class communities" as concern for six focal concerns: trouble, toughness, smartness, excitement, fate, autonomy. Miller described these focal concerns as "areas or issues which command widespread and persistent attention and a high degree of emotional involvement."  Miller's theory, as it is often referred to, views these criminogenic influences as a learned part of the lower-class subculture values. In essence, the theory suggests that delinquency is in fact part of the learned cultural values rather than an anomic reaction to unattainable goals.

See also
 Core values
 David Matza
 Sentencing disparity
 Social values
 Uncertainty avoidance

References

Bibliography
 Cohen, Albert. Delinquent Boys (New York: Free press, 1995) pg. 19–25 
 Miller, Walter. "Lower-class Culture as a Generating Milieu of Gang Delinquency," Journal of Social Issues 14 (1958): 5–19
 Flowers, Barri R. The Adolescent Criminal: An Examination of Today's Juvenile Offender. McFarland & Company, Inc. 108–109

Further reading
 
 
 Frank, James., Stoddard, Cody., Engel, Robin. and Haas, Stephen. "Through the Court's Eyes: A New Look at Focal Concerns Theory" Paper presented at the annual meeting of the American Society of Criminology (ASC), Los Angeles Convention Center, Los Angeles, CA, Nov 01, 2006 <Not Available>. 2009-05-24 <http://www.allacademic.com/meta/p127319_index.html>

External links
  Concerning Conceptualization and Operationalization:Sentencing Data and the Focal Concerns Perspective—A Research Note, The Southwest Journal of Criminal Justice

Sentencing (law)
Subculture theory
Social theories